The Saudi Council of Ministers ( Majlis al-Wuzarā' as-Su'ūdī) is the cabinet of the Kingdom of Saudi Arabia. It is led by the King. The council consists of the king, the Crown Prince, and cabinet ministers. The Crown Prince is also Prime Minister and Chair of the Council of Ministers. Since 2015, there are 23 ministers with portfolio and seven ministers of state, two of whom have special responsibilities. All members of the council are appointed by royal decree.

The Council of Ministers was established by King Abdulaziz in 1953. It is responsible for "drafting and overseeing the implementation of the internal, external, financial, economic, educational and defense policies, and general affairs of the state." It functions in accordance with the Basic Law of Saudi Arabia and is advised by the Consultative Assembly. Legislation must be ratified by a royal decree. It meets every Tuesday and is chaired by the King in his capacity as Prime Minister or one of his deputies. It is the final authority for financial, executive and administrative matters. Its resolutions are non-binding unless agreed upon by a majority vote. In case of a tie, the Prime Minister casts the tie-breaking vote. The present law governing the form and function of the Council of Ministers was issued by King Fahd in 1993. Among others, it stipulates that every member of the Council must be "a Saudi national by birth and descent; well-known for righteousness and capability;" and "not previously convicted for a crime of immorality or dishonor."

In the early hours of 29 April 2015, King Salman issued 25 royal decrees which included a cabinet reshuffle. This included the removal of his brother Muqrin bin Abdulaziz as Crown Prince and appointment of his nephew Muhammad bin Nayef. The King appointed his son Mohammed bin Salman as Deputy Crown Prince.

In another reshuffle on 21 June 2017, King Salman has removed his nephew as Crown Prince and appointed his son, Mohammed bin Salman, as the new Crown Prince.

Members of the Council of Ministers

Council for Security and Political Affairs (CSPA) and Council of Economic and Development Affairs (CEDA) 
On 29 January 2015, King Salman bin Abdulaziz ordered major changes to his government including a cabinet shuffle. Amongst a wide range of decrees and in a bid to streamline decision-making and make the government more efficient, the king abolished 12 public bodies - namely, the Higher Committee for Education Policy, Higher Committee for Administrative Organization, Civil Service Council, Higher Commission of King Abdulaziz City for Science and Technology, Council of Higher Education and Universities, Supreme Council for Education, Supreme Council for Petroleum and Minerals, Supreme Economic Council, National Security Council, Supreme Council of King Abdullah City for Atomic and Renewable Energy, Supreme Council for Islamic Affairs, and the Supreme Council for Disabled Affairs - responsible for drawing up policies in fields ranging from energy to education. To eliminate redundancies, King Salman replaced them with two new councils linked to the Council of Ministers: the Council for Security and Political Affairs (CSPA) headed by Crown Prince Mohammad bin Nayef, and the Council of Economic and Development Affairs (CEDA) headed by Deputy Crown Prince Mohammad bin Salman.

See also

Politics of Saudi Arabia

References

External links
Statements of the Council of Ministers Ministry of Foreign Affairs
Law of the Council of Ministers
Ministry of Social Affairs Saudi Arabia

Saudi Arabia
Main